A checkwriter may refer to:

Occupation
A person who physically writes a check or cheque. The check writer is also known as the "payor", "signer", "maker", the drawer, or the "account holder". The signer or presenter of the check, or person who prints and authorizes the check.

In U.S. law, in Article 3 of the Uniform Commercial Code, codified in most U.S. State statutes, a check is an order (as opposed to a promise) to pay a fixed amount of money, according to §3-104(a).

§3-104(f) specifies that

{{cquote|"Check" means(i) a draft, other than a documentary draft, payable on demand and drawn on a bank; or(ii) a cashier's check or teller's check.An instrument may be a check even though it is described on its face by another term, such as 'money order.' }}

Such an order is issued by the drawer.

§3-103(a)(3) specifies that

Machine

A check writer (also known as a "ribbon writer", "check signer", "check protector" or "check embosser"), is a physical device for protecting a check from unauthorized alteration of either the amount or the authorizing signature.

Devices of this type that use various technologies are also known as check protectors, check punches, and check perforators. A check punch punches holes in the shapes of numerals. A check perforator punches small round holes that form numerals.

A check writer, or ribbon writer, leaves a numerical or written value impression in the payment amount field of a check that is very difficult to alter. This is accomplished by the machine applying downward force on the check and leaving very small inked shreds in the paper.

The first check protector was introduced in 1870. The best known check protectors in the early 1900s had the brand name Protectograph (the Todd Company, Rochester, NY). Other well known manufacturers in the industry were F & E Hedman and the Paymaster Company (both out of Chicago, IL).

The person preparing a check positions the check in the check writer so its print-heads are centered over the field on the check where the amount of the check would otherwise be written out in words. Using a series of levers or buttons on the checkwriter's control panel, the operator enters the monetary amount of the check. This amount is then printed onto the check by the operator pulling a lever on the side of the unit (or by pressing a button on electric units). This brings the print-heads down upon a wide inked (usually multicolor) ribbon through which they print the selected amount on the check, with a prefix and suffix to prevent a fraudster from adding extra digits. Entering $6,762.64, for example, will produce text reading "TheSum6762dol's64cts".

There is a series of (usually) horizontal indentations on a pressure bar brought up underneath the check during this process, which matches similar indentations on the print-heads. This embosses the numeric amount through the paper of the check form, strongly discouraging any attempt to alter or raise this amount.

Because physical check writers and ribbon writers are now considered antique, businesses that still need this check protection technology such as a business, or organization which regularly prepares remittances by issuing high-amount checks can use a physical check writing device. Financial institutions regularly use them to prepare cashier's checks, and they are also used by issuers of money orders such as the United States Postal Service. Newer versions are electronic, but many are still made by Paymaster.

Software
Online Check Writer is a cloud-based check printing software. This online application facilitates Check printing of any bank, on any blank Check paper using any printer. The company claims they are integrated with QuickBooks and 16000+ Banks and Financial Institutions. The main advantage of the application is it's easy to detect Fraudulent Checks.

CheckWriter is business software used to accept payments from customers, patients, members or subscribers. Unlike a physical device, the software facilitates check draft demand draft technology, and Check 21 Act regulations to emulate the check writer.'The software prints a physical draft of a customer's checks that a business can then deposit into any U.S. bank the same day. The software has been in circulation since 1996 and operates on a Microsoft Windows PC platform.

Uses for CheckWriter software include bill payment acceptance by phone for insurance companies, hospitals, collections agencies, medical professionals, utilities, loan providers, telemarketers, and almost any other industry that needs to take check payments from customers.

The company claims CheckWriter'' as their trademark since 1996 in the software industry, according to their publications, prosecution history, and public record.

See also
 Money order
 Cashier's check
 Banker's draft
 Demand draft

References

External links
 Paymaster Brand physical check writer machine
 National Check Fraud Center

Banking terms
Office equipment